Pinehaven is a suburb of Upper Hutt City in the lower North Island of New Zealand, established in 1927. It is at the southern end of the city, within the pine covered hills east of Silverstream.

Pinehaven is a valley centred on a large reserve and area of native bush. Clustered around the reserve are a number of community facilities.

History 

The hills of Pinehaven were first planted with their trademark pine trees in 1928 by Sir Francis Chichester and Mr G.D.M Goodwin. Most of the streets in Pinehaven are named after members of their families, Wyndham (Road) was Goodwin's son, Jocelyn (Crescent) his daughter and Elmslie (Road) his mother's maiden name. Of course, Chichester Drive is named after Sir Francis himself.

Originally Pinehaven was a community of small baches where residents of Wellington city escaped to for weekends and holidays. Pinehaven has a strong history of community togetherness and since the 1940s the residents' association, the Pinehaven Progressive Association, has actively fought for local issues and organised social functions.

Demographics

Pinehaven had a population of 1,983 at the 2018 New Zealand census, an increase of 93 people (4.9%) since the 2013 census, and an increase of 135 people (7.3%) since the 2006 census. There were 708 households. There were 996 males and 987 females, giving a sex ratio of 1.01 males per female. The median age was 39.3 years (compared with 37.4 years nationally), with 462 people (23.3%) aged under 15 years, 285 (14.4%) aged 15 to 29, 1,020 (51.4%) aged 30 to 64, and 213 (10.7%) aged 65 or older.

Ethnicities were 93.2% European/Pākehā, 7.1% Māori, 3.3% Pacific peoples, 3.8% Asian, and 2.6% other ethnicities (totals add to more than 100% since people could identify with multiple ethnicities).

The proportion of people born overseas was 25.7%, compared with 27.1% nationally.

Although some people objected to giving their religion, 55.1% had no religion, 34.9% were Christian, 0.8% were Hindu, 0.3% were Muslim, 0.6% were Buddhist and 2.6% had other religions.

Of those at least 15 years old, 528 (34.7%) people had a bachelor or higher degree, and 132 (8.7%) people had no formal qualifications. The median income was $47,000, compared with $31,800 nationally. The employment status of those at least 15 was that 909 (59.8%) people were employed full-time, 225 (14.8%) were part-time, and 42 (2.8%) were unemployed.

Facilities

The Pinehaven Progressive Association Community Hall was built with recycled materials by Pinehaven locals during the 1940s. The land was gifted to the community in perpetuity by a local man, Mr Goowdin.

Pinehaven has a library, which started in 1954 with a small collection of books kept in a resident's home.

It also has a Scout Hall, built in 1972.

Education

It opened in 1954.

Pinehaven Playcentre, opened in the 1970s, provides preschool education for 0 to 6-year-olds.

References

External links
Pinehaven Progressive Association

Suburbs of Upper Hutt